The Ukrainian (Greek) Catholic Eparchy of Olsztyn–Gdańsk (Olsztyn–Gdańsk of the Ukrainians) is a suffragan eparchy (Eastern Catholic diocese) in the ecclesiastical province of the Metropolitan Archeparchy of Przemyśl–Warsawa, which covers some part of Poland for the Ukrainian Greek Catholic Church (Byzantine rite in Ukrainian language) parallel to the Latin hierarchy. It depends from the Roman Congregation for the Oriental Churches.

Its episcopal see is the Cathedral of the Protection of the Mother of God in Olsztyn in the Warmian-Masurian Voivodeship.

It also has a Co-Cathedral, St. Bartholomew and Protection of the Mother of God, in Gdańsk, in the Pomeranian Voivodeship.

Statistics
As per 2020, it pastorally served in 43 parishes with 26 priests (22 diocesan, 4 religious, that belong to the Order of Saint Basil the Great).

History
25 November 2020: the Eparchy was established as Eparchy of Olsztyn–Gdańsk from the Ukrainian Catholic Archeparchy of Przemyśl–Warsaw and the Ukrainian Catholic Eparchy of Wrocław-Gdańsk.

Eparchial bishops

''Eparchs of Olsztyn–Gdańsk 
 Apostolic Administrator Metropolitan Eugeniusz Popowicz (25 November 2020 – 23 January 2021)
 Arkadiusz Trochanowski (since 25 November 2020)

See also 
 Ukrainian Greek Catholic Church
 List of Catholic dioceses in Poland

References

Sources and external links 
 Profile at Catholic Hierarchy
 Profile at GCatholic

Eparchies of the Ukrainian Greek Catholic Church in Poland
Eastern Catholicism in Poland
Olsztyn–Gdańsk